Chicá is a corregimiento in Chame District, Panamá Oeste Province, Panama with a population of 713 as of 2010. Its population as of 1990 was 610; its population as of 2000 was 600.

References

Corregimientos of Panamá Oeste Province